Elizabeth T. Wyce "Yummy" Bingham (born January 7, 1986) is an American singer and songwriter.

Biography
Bingham was born on January 7, 1986, to R&B producer Dinky Bingham and Patricia Wyce. She was put into her grandparents care in South Jamaica, Queens, New York. She is the god-daughter of Chaka Khan and Aaron Hall.

Career
In 2000, at age 14, Bingham was recruited by producer KayGee to form the group Tha' Rayne, signed to Arista. The group recorded an album, appeared on a bunch of labelmates tracks including Jaheim's Fabulous that hit #1 on the US Billboard Adult R&B chart for three weeks from February 1, 2003, to February 22, 2003. The group released the single "Didn't You Know", peaking at #76 in September 2003 on the US Billboard R&B chart. Their debut album, "Reign Supreme" never came out and the group disbanded in 2005.

While being a member of Tha' Rayne, Bingham was also getting a name for herself as the appointed vocalist of veteran hip-hop group De La Soul, being featured on various of their songs and singles, and accompanying them on tour between 2000 and 2004. From 2003, Bingham started to collaborate to various artists, getting writing and/or vocals credits on songs from Talib Kweli, Patti LaBelle, Lupe Fiasco, Black Sheep, P. Diddy, Christina Aguilera Mary J. Blige, Sunshine Anderson, Busta Rhymes, Nas, Keyshia Cole, Amerie, Mýa or Monica.

At age 18, Bingham became the youngest female CEO of a major-affiliated label  and the youngest female record executive. She formed the label "Muzic Park" with Grammy award-winning beatmaker Rockwilder and was the label's first artist through a record deal with Motown in the United States and Island Records in the United Kingdom,. She released the singles "Come Get It", "Is It Good To You" and "One More Chance" and released her debut album The First Seed in the UK in October 2006.

She continued writing and recording for other artists and gave birth to her daughter Aviela in September 2007. She took some time out of the record industry to do Gospel/Inspirational music but eventually returned to secular R&B in 2010 with a new song called "Circles" that was featured in the movie "King of Paper Chasin". She also announced acting projects.

In 2013, she teamed up with alternative R&B producer Nyce Hitz to record new material. From October 29 to December 31, 2013, Bingham offered a music series untitled "Taste Tuesdays" consisting of the release through the online music magazine Singersroom, of 10 unreleased songs, most of them being exclusive songs not appearing on her 10-tracks mixtape "No Artificial Flavorz" that she released subsequently, on January 7, 2014, promoted by singles "Cuffin" and "Can We Stay" (featuring Kardinal Offishall). The same year Bingham was featured on Cam'ron's single "So Bad" with Nicki Minaj.

In April 2015, Bingham released the single "Hard to Love".

Discography

Albums

Singles as a solo performer

Singles as featured performer

Soundtrack appearances

Other appearances

References

External links
 

Singers from New York City
People from Jamaica, Queens
African-American women singer-songwriters
American contemporary R&B singers
1986 births
Living people
Singers with a four-octave vocal range
American sopranos
21st-century American women singers
Universal Motown Records artists
21st-century African-American women
20th-century African-American people
Singer-songwriters from New York (state)
20th-century African-American women